HMS E12 was a British E class submarine built by HM Dockyard, Chatham.  She was laid down on 16 December 1912 and commissioned on 14 October 1914. Her construction costs totalled £101,900.

During the Great War, anti-submarine nets in the Dardanelles entangled her forward hydroplanes, forcing her down to a depth of 245 feet.  At the time, this was the greatest depth achieved by any British submarine. E12 managed to surface only to come under fire by shore batteries, but avoided further damage. She survived the war and was sold for scrap in Malta on 7 March 1921.

Design
She was powered by two  Vickers eight-cylinder two-stroke diesel engines and two  electric motors.

E12 was armed with a single 4-inch QF gun mounted forward of the conning tower, and five 18 inch (450 mm) torpedo tubes, two in the bow, one either side amidships, and one in the stern; a total of 10 torpedoes were carried.

E-Class submarines had wireless systems with  power ratings; in some submarines, these were later upgraded to  systems by removing a midship torpedo tube. Their maximum design depth was  although in service some reached depths of below . Some submarines contained Fessenden oscillator systems.

Crew
Her complement was three officers and 28 men.

References

 Akerman, P. (1989). Encyclopaedia of British submarines 1901–1955.  p. 150. Maritime Books. 

 

British E-class submarines of the Royal Navy
Ships built in Chatham
1914 ships
World War I submarines of the United Kingdom
Royal Navy ship names